Salome Zourabichvili (born 18 March 1952) is a Franco-Georgian politician and former diplomat who currently serves as the fifth President of Georgia, in office since December 2018. She is the first woman to be elected as Georgia's president, a position she will occupy for a term of six years. As a result of constitutional changes coming into effect in 2024, Zourabichvili is expected to be Georgia's last popularly elected president; all future heads of state are to be elected indirectly by a  parliamentary college of electors.

Zourabichvili was born in Paris, France into a family of Georgian political refugees. She joined the French diplomatic service in the 1970s and went on to occupy a variety of increasingly senior diplomatic positions over three decades. From 2003 to 2004, she served as the Ambassador of France to Georgia. In 2004, by mutual agreement between the presidents of France and Georgia, she accepted Georgian nationality and became the Foreign Minister of Georgia. During her tenure at the Georgian Ministry of Foreign Affairs (MFA), she negotiated a landmark treaty that led to the withdrawal of Russian forces from the undisputed parts of the Georgian mainland. She has also served at the UN Security Council’s Iran Sanctions Committee as the Coordinator of the Panel of Experts.

After a falling out with Georgia's then president Mikheil Saakashvili, in 2006 Zourabichvili founded The Way of Georgia political party, which she led until 2010. Ultimately, she was elected to the Georgian Parliament in 2016 as an independent; she vacated her parliamentary seat after being sworn in as president. Zourabichvili ran in the 2018 Georgian presidential election as an independent candidate and prevailed in a run-off vote against the United National Movement nominee Grigol Vashadze. During her presidential campaign Zurabishvili was endorsed by the ruling Georgian Dream party; however, following the 2020–2021 Georgian political crisis, Zourabichvili has become increasingly alienated from the Georgian government, which has also heightened after the 2023 Georgian protests

Family and personal life

Ancestry 

Salome Zourabichvili was born into a family of Georgian emigrants that fled to France following the 1921 Red Army invasion of the Democratic Republic of Georgia.  Her father, Levan Zourabichvili, a career engineer, served for many years as chairman of the Georgian Association of France (AGF). Levan is the maternal grandson of Niko Nikoladze (1843-1928), a businessman, philanthropist and Georgian politician of the late 19th century who served as a member of the Social-Democratic Party and was an influential leader of the Georgian liberal intelligentsia during the Russian Empire. Her mother Zeïnab Kedia (1921-2016) was a daughter of Melkisedek Kedia, head of the Security Service of the Democratic Republic of Georgia.

Salome Zourabichvili has one brother, Othar Zourabichvili, a doctor, writer and chairman of the AGF since 2006. They are cousins of historian Hélène Carrère d'Encausse, a member of the Académie Française, and philosopher François Zourabichvili.

Youth 
Salomé Nino Zourabichvili was born in Paris on 18 March 1952 and was raised within the Georgian community in France, settled between Paris and Leuville-sur-Orge since the 1921 fall of the Democratic Republic of Georgia. Raised in a prominent emigrant family with close ties to the government in-exile of Georgia, the diaspora was the only contact she had in her childhood with the country, once stating: 

At 8 years old, she met her first visitor from Georgia during a visit to Paris by a Georgian ballet troupe, a meeting held in secret because of the repressive nature of the Soviet authorities organizing the visit. In an interview with The Washington Post, she said she felt comfortable "straddling the two cultures", attending French schools while going to the Georgian church of Paris on the weekends.

Higher education 

At the age of 17, Salome Zourabichvili received baccalauréat results that allowed her "the privilege of a direct admission in the terrible preparatory year" of the Paris Institute of Political Studies (Sciences Po) in September 1969, a program out of which only half of participants reach the Institute after a year. In May 1970, her final exam topic choice on "Revolution and Counter-Revolution in Europe between 1917 and 1923" guaranteed her a spot at the Institute. Later in 2019, the school would describe her results on the topics on the Rerum novarum, Kulturkampf and Alexander II's reforms as a "triumph", while a professor described her as a "very smart student who quickly learned the methodology and know-how of the program".

In 1970, she joined the International Section of Sciences Po, a path toward diplomatic service accessed only by a minority of the 4,000 students at the Institute, of which a third were women. She studied under a number of well-known French professors, such as historians Jean-Baptiste Duroselle, Louis Chevalier, her cousin Hélène Carrère d'Encausse and the international lawyer Suzanne Bastid, the latter two being the only women teaching at Sciences Po. Salome Zourabichvili concentrated her studies on the Soviet world and graduated in July 1972.

In a letter of recommendation by Sciences Po Secretary-General René Henry-Gréard, the latter described her as a student who, despite her "shyness", possessed "exceptional qualities" and predicted a great future for her. She joined Columbia University in 1972-1973 where Zbigniew Brzezinski, at the time director of the Trilateral Commission, trained her on Soviet politics and Cold War diplomacy.

She has said that choosing a career in diplomacy was linked with hopes to one day being instrumental in helping Georgia.

Teaching career 
Salome Zourabichvili returned to Sciences Po in 2006, this time as a professor shortly after her departure as Georgian Minister of Foreign Affairs. She worked until 2014 at the Paris School of International Affairs, teaching the foreign policy of large powers, the post-Soviet world, the development of Eurasia since the fall of the USSR, and the causes for that fall. In that post, she academically analyzed the progress of the European Union in times of crisis. A student would later describe her classes as "encouraging important debates".

She is the first student and professor of Sciences Po to become head of state.

Family and private life 
From a first marriage to Iranian-American World Bank economist Nicolas Gorjestani (himself of Georgian origin), she has two children: Kéthévane (France 24 journalist) and Théïmouraz (a French diplomat). She married in 1993 as a second husband Janri Kashia, an influential Georgian writer and journalist who was a political refugee in France. Kashia died in 2012.

Besides French and limited Georgian, Salome Zourabichvili speaks fluent English and Italian.

Career in France

Diplomatic beginnings 
Salome Zourabichvili abandoned her studies to join the French diplomatic service in 1974. She quickly became a career diplomat and was sent as Third Secretary to the French Embassy in Rome until 1977, under the ambassadorships of Charles Lucet and François Puaux, after which she became Second Secretary to the Permanent Mission of France to the UN until 1980. Working under seasoned diplomat Jacques Leprette, she saw France twice preside the UN Security Council in October 1978 and January 1980.

After returning to Paris where she worked as an officer of the Policy Planning Staff of the French Ministry of Foreign Affairs, she went back to the United States in 1984 as First Secretary to the French Embassy in Washington, D.C. under Ambassador Emmanuel de Margerie, working in the political and military section and focusing on US-Soviet affairs. It was during this posting that she visited for the first time Georgia in 1986, taking her mother with her. Between 1988 and 1989, she was sent to Vienna as First Secretary to the French Mission to the Conference on Security and Co-operation in Europe, leading the French negotiating team for the reduction of conventional forces.

In 1989-1992, she became Second Adviser to the French Embassy in Chad. Her term there coincides with the takeover of power by Idriss Déby in a coup d'état supported by France.

Brussels and return to Paris 
In 1992, Zourabichvili was appointed First Secretary to the Permanent Mission of France to NATO in Brussels, before becoming Deputy Permanent Representative of France to the Western European Union, still in Brussels, from 1993 to 1996.

In 1996 and 1997, she held the post of Technical Adviser at the Cabinet of the Ministry of Foreign Affairs in Paris. In 1997-1998, she was Inspector at the MFA, still in Paris, before she was appointed Under-Director of Strategic Affairs at the Management of Strategic Affairs, Security and Disarmament of the MFA, a post she leaves in 2001 to become director of International and Strategic Affairs at the General Secretariat of National Defense. She also works with the Bureau of Strategic Affairs of NATO.

Ambassador to Georgia 
Between 2003 and 2004, Salome Zourabichvili was Ambassador Extraordinary and Plenipotentiary of France to Georgia.

Georgian Politics

Minister of Foreign Affairs 

President Mikhail Saakashvili of Georgia nominated her as Minister of Foreign Affairs in his new government. Zourabichvili became the first woman to be appointed to this post in Georgia on 18 March 2004.

Zourabichvili was the Coordinator of the Panel of Experts assisting the UN Security Council’s Iran Sanctions Committee.

As foreign minister of Georgia, Zourabichvili was the main negotiator of the agreement for the withdrawal of Russian military bases from the territory of Georgia, which was signed with Russian Minister of Foreign Affairs Sergey Lavrov on 19 May 2005. During her tenure as Foreign Minister, the "New Group of Friends of Georgia" was created, bringing together Ukraine, Lithuania, Latvia, Estonia, Romania, Bulgaria, the Czech Republic and Poland to help Georgia's aspirations towards NATO and foster European integration.

Zourabichvili was sacked by Prime Minister Zurab Nogaideli late on 19 October 2005 after a series of disputes with members of Parliament. She had also been heavily criticized by a number of Georgian ambassadors. Shortly before her dismissal was announced, Zourabichvili resigned from the French foreign service, which had continued to pay her a salary while she was minister, and announced that she would remain in Georgia to go into politics.

Political career 

In November 2005, Zourabichvili set up the organization 'Salomé Zourabichvili’s Movement'. In January 2006 she announced the establishment of a new political party Georgia's Way, criticizing the country's "de facto one-party system." Although Zourabichvili enjoyed some degree of reputation in Georgia she was long unable to establish herself in the political field. At the city council elections in Tbilisi on 5 October 2006, only 2.77% of the constituency voted for her party. Six months before, an opinion poll conducted by the Georgian weekly Kviris Palitra suggested that she would garner 23.1% of the votes at presidential elections. Since October 2007, her party was part of the United Opposition alliance which nominated Zourabichvili as a Prospective Prime Minister in case of their candidate Levan Gachechiladze's victory in the January 2008 presidential election.

As part of a 2009 campaign of the Georgian opposition to force President Mikheil Saakashvili to resign, Zourabichvili led a protest march together with three other prominent opposition figures – Nino Burjanadze, David Gamkrelidze and Eka Beselia – in Tbilisi on 26 March 2009.

On 12 November 2010, Zourabichvili announced her withdrawal from the leadership of Georgia's Way. She was succeeded by Kakha Seturidze. After a two-year leave from politics, she publicly endorsed Georgian Dream ahead of the 2013 presidential elections. Shortly after, Georgia's Central Election Commission refused to register her as a presidential candidate due to her dual Georgian-French citizenship.

In the 8 October 2016 parliamentary elections Zourabichvili won a seat as an independent, representing the Mtatsminda district of Tbilisi. She became MP on 18 November. During her term as MP, She was Deputy chairwoman of parliamentary committee on Diaspora and Caucasus Issues.

2018 presidential candidacy

On 20 April 2017, during a TV interview, Zurabishvili said that "nothing is out of the question" about her participation in the 2018 presidential elections. At a briefing in her backyard on 6 August 2018, she voiced her desire to run in the election. On 16 August 2018, she officially launched her presidential campaign from the house-museum of her ancestor Niko Nikoladze in the village of Didi Jikhaishi, Imereti region.

On 23 August 2018, two months before the elections, Zurabishvili relinquished her French citizenship, which she had to renounce to participate in the presidential election. According to the Constitution of Georgia, dual citizens cannot hold the office of president, prime minister or Speaker of Parliament. On 9 September 2018, the Georgian Dream party announced its support for Zurabishvili's independent candidacy for the presidential elections.

The presidential elections were held on 23 October 2018. Zurabishvili received 38.64% of the vote (615,572 votes) and secured a place in the second round of elections against the United Opposition candidate. The second round of the presidential election was held on November 28. Zurabishvili received 59.52% of the vote (1,147,625 votes), defeating her opponent Grigol Vasadze to become the first woman president in the History of Georgia.

Presidency

Inauguration

On December 16, the inauguration of the 5th President of Georgia was held at the Erekle II Palace in Telavi. Zurabishvili wore a white and red ensemble, the colors of the Georgian flag, to the ceremony, designed by Jaba Diasamidze, a Georgian designer working in France. The president-elect was taken to the palace by car, and her children - Teimuraz and Ketevan Gorgestani - drove her to the red carpet.

The event was attended by a total of 1800 guests. According to the decision of the organizers, all guests, except those with health problems, stood on their feet. Among those present at the inauguration were the 4th President of Georgia Giorgi Margvelashvili and his wife, the Catholicos-Patriarch of All Georgia, Ilia II, the President of Armenia, Armen Sargsyan, the former President of France, Nicolas Sarkozy and representatives of other delegations.

As president, Zourabichvili inherited a new Constitution that entered into force the day of her inauguration and which significantly removed several powers from the Presidency, concentrating them within Parliament and the Prime Minister's Office. However, this did not stop her from using her position to call for historically-important decisions, including a new investigation into the controversial death of Zviad Gamsakhurdia, the country's first president, in 1993.

Domestic policy

Zurabishvili's first annual report as President was presented to the 9th convocation of Parliament on 6 March 2019. [120] The European Georgia faction did not attend the president's speech. In her speech, Zurabishvili focused on her visits abroad.

On 20 April 2021, Zurabishvili hosted an official dinner in honor of the President of the European Council, Charles Michel. Representatives of the ruling team as well as the opposition parties who signed the Charles Michel document were present at the dinner at the Presidential Palace. The dinner was attended by EU Ambassador to Georgia Carl Hartzell and US Ambassador Kelly Degnan. By signing the document of Charles Michel, the representatives of the opposition and the government made political concessions.

Coronavirus pandemic

On 10 March 2020, President Zurabishvili canceled scheduled visits to Bulgaria, Belgium, and Ukraine due to the coronavirus threat. [142] On March 21 of the same year, she declared a state of emergency in the country. The state of emergency was to last for a month, although on 21 April 2020, the president signed an extension until May 21.

On 22 December 2020, Zurabishvili hosted Hans Kluge, Director of the WHO Regional Office for Europe, at the Orbeliani Palace. During the meeting, the health measures taken by Georgia during the pandemic and issues related to the COVID-19 vaccine were discussed. On 26 January 2021, Zurabishvili met with Toivo Klaar, Co-Chair of the Geneva International Talks, EU Special Representative for the South Caucasus and the Crisis in Georgia.

Foreign policy

As President of Georgia, Zurabishvili has visited many countries where she has represented her homeland and advocated for its interests, and met with foreign leaders. On 25 September 2019, Zurabishvili addressed the 74th session of the UN General Assembly in New York. In her speech, she spoke about the occupation, the ongoing political processes in Georgia, healthcare and climate change.

In January 2020 she visited Belgium, and in February she visited France and Afghanistan. She has also visited the leaders of Ukraine, Armenia, Germany, Poland, Latvia, Azerbaijan and many other countries.

Popular opinion in Georgia hardened against Russia in the wake of the February 2022 Russian invasion of Ukraine, and on  3 March together with Moldova the country made a formal application to the EU for membership. The chairman of the Georgian Dream party, Irakli Kobakhidze called for EU bodies to review application "in an emergency manner and to make the decision to grant Georgia the status of an EU membership candidate", while Zurabishvili said "You can try to frighten countries but that doesn’t mean you change their orientation, that you change their determination to keep their independence."

During an interview with DW News in May 2022, Zourabichvili stated that Georgia was in full compliance with the international financial sanctions on Russia and wanted a "quicker and shorter path towards integration" into NATO and the EU. She remarked that both France under Macron and Germany under Scholz had shifted their stance which ante-dated the August 2008 Russo-Georgian War and now embraced expansionary policies.

Residence and funding 

Zourabichvili announced during the presidential campaign that, if elected, she would not work from the Avlabari Presidential Palace, opened in 2009 during the Presidency of Mikheil Saakashvili. After her election, she met with the outgoing fourth President in the Avlabari Palace, but her administration moved into the Orbeliani Palace on Atoneli street in Central Tbilisi. On 18 December 2018 she visited the Atoneli residence for the first time. The media met her at the entrance, emphasising the fact that she walked to the office.

Besides moving to the smaller residence, Zourabichvili's office faced significant budget cutbacks. According to the 2019 budget, funding for the presidential administration is being reduced by just over € 3.5 million. As a result, the vast majority of former employees were fired with only 60 of them remaining in administration.

Changes have also led to abolishing the presidential fund which amounted to ₾5 million and funded scholarships, educational programs and various other projects. This decision has been widely criticized with former President Giorgi Margvelashvili and former First Lady Maka Chichua campaigning for it to remain.

Political positions

Women's rights and equality
As the first popularly elected woman president of Georgia, Zourabichvili has advocated for women's rights and equality through social media and from political tribunes. She has organised a number of meetings and attended conferences aiming for the empowerment of women and young girls. On October 5th 2019, she hosted a meeting of women leaders from Georgia, Belgium and France, later saying on Twitter: "The role of women in our society is crucial and their contribution to our political, cultural, entrepreneurial and educational circles is key to our development."

LGBTQ rights
Amid the controversy around the 2019 Tbilisi Pride Parade, Zourabichvili said: “I am everyone’s president, regardless of sexual orientation or religious affiliation. No human should be discriminated against. I must also emphasize that our country is dealing with enough controversies and doesn’t need any further provocation from any side of the LGBTQ debate." This comment was met with criticism by LGBTQ organizations across the country, as well as some members of the civil society. Tbilisi Pride co-founder Tamaz Sozashvili wrote: "How can she consider peaceful citizens and aggressive fundamentalists as equal sides?" She made no response to the criticism.

Following attacks on the offices of Tbilisi Pride by anti-LGBT protesters on July 5, 2021, in which a number of journalists, activists and passersby were injured, Zourabichvili condemned the violence and visited injured journalists in hospital. She subsequently tweeted:

"Violence is unacceptable. I condemn today’s events and any form of violence over difference of ideas or gender identity. Everyone has the constitutional right to express their opinion. I call on all to act within the Constitution and not provoke violence through radical actions.

In June 2022, Zourabichvili condemned the homophobic protest by far-right groups in front of the EU delegation offices in Tbilisi.

Monarchy
In the course of the 2008 Georgian presidential election, Zourabichvili and many other opposition politicians voiced support for the establishment of a constitutional monarchy under the Bagrationi dynasty, which the Patriarch of Georgia, Ilia II, had advocated.

Foreign honours

Works 
 Une femme pour deux pays ["A Woman for Two Countries"] by Salome Zourabichvili (Édition Grasset, 2006) 
 საქართველოსკენ ["Toward Georgia"] by Salome Zourabichvili (Litera, 2005) 
 Les cicatrices des nations ["The Scar of Nations"] by Salome Zourabichvili (Édition François Bourin, 2008) 
 La tragédie géorgienne ["The Georgian Tragedy"] by Salome Zourabichvili (Édition Grasset, 2009) 
 L’exigence démocratique ["The Democratic Necessity"] by Salome Zourabichvili (Édition François Bourin, 2010)

Notes

References

External links

 
 
Official website

|-

1952 births
21st-century politicians from Georgia (country)
21st-century women politicians from Georgia (country)
Ambassadors of France to Georgia (country)
Female foreign ministers
Foreign Ministers of Georgia
French people of Georgian descent
Knights of the Ordre national du Mérite
Living people
Monarchists from Georgia (country)
Feminists from Georgia (country)
Politicians from Paris
Presidents of Georgia
School of International and Public Affairs, Columbia University alumni
Sciences Po alumni
The Way of Georgia politicians
Women diplomats from Georgia (country)
Women government ministers of Georgia (country)
Female heads of state
Women presidents
French women ambassadors
Zourabichvili family